Edyta may refer to:

People
 Edyta Bartosiewicz (born 1965), Polish rock singer
 Edyta Dzieniszewska (born 1986), Polish sprint canoer
 Edyta Geppert (born 1953), popular Polish singer
 Edyta Górniak (born 1972), Polish pop singer
 Edyta Herbuś (born 1981), Polish dancer, model, and actress
 Edyta Jasińska (born 1986), Polish track cyclist
 Edyta Jungowska (born 1966), Polish theater, film and television actress
 Edyta Koryzna (born 1973), Polish former basketball player
 Edyta Krzemień (born 1985), Polish actress and singer
 Edyta Śliwińska (born 1981), Polish ballroom dancer

See also
 Edita

Polish feminine given names